The Hong Kong International Medical Devices and Supplies Fair is a trade fair organised by the Hong Kong Trade Development Council, held annually at the Hong Kong Convention and Exhibition Centre. The 2009 fair attracted over 150 exhibitors from 12 countries and regions. Several themed zones which include Medical Device, Medical Supplies and Disposables, and Tech Exchange help buyers connect with the right suppliers.

Major exhibit categories 
Accident and Emergency Equipment 
Building Technology and Hospital Furniture 
Chinese Medical Devices 
Communication, Systems and Information Technology 
Dental Equipment and Supplies 
Diagnostics 
Electromedical Equipment / Medical Technology 
Laboratory Equipment 
Medical Components and Materials 
Medical Supplies and Disposables 
Physiotherapy / Orthopaedic / Rehabilitation Technology 
Textiles

References

External links 
 Hong Kong International Medical Devices and Supplies Fair 

Medical devices
Trade fairs in Hong Kong